The Whitewater River is a  tributary of the Walnut River in southern Kansas in the United States.  Via the Walnut and Arkansas Rivers, it is part of the watershed of the Mississippi River.

According to the Geographic Names Information System, the stream has also been known as Whitewater Creek.

Course
The Whitewater River rises in southern Marion County (southeast of Peabody) and flows southwardly into Butler County, past the towns of Potwin and Towanda, then joins the Walnut River at Augusta.

In Butler County, the river collects the West Branch Whitewater River, which rises in Harvey County and flows southeastwardly past Whitewater; and the East Branch Whitewater River, which rises near Burns in Marion County and flows southwestwardly.

Lakes
 Harvey County East Lake, east of Newton.
 Augusta Lake, northwest side of Augusta.
 Santa Fe Lake, west of Augusta.

See also
List of Kansas rivers

References

DeLorme (2003).  Kansas Atlas & Gazetteer.  Yarmouth, Maine: DeLorme.  .

Rivers of Kansas
Rivers of Butler County, Kansas
Rivers of Harvey County, Kansas
Rivers of Marion County, Kansas